Kiatjarern Ruangparn (born 9 April 1987) is a retired professional footballer from Thailand. He played in the 2010 Thai League Cup final and won a winner's medal after Thai Port defeated Buriram PEA F.C. 2-1.

Honours

Club
Thai Port F.C.
 Thai FA Cup winner (1) : 2009
 Thai League Cup winner (1) : 2010

External links
 Thai Port FC Official Website
 https://us.soccerway.com/players/kiatjarern-ruangparn/119066/

1982 births
Living people
Kiatjarern Ruangparn
Kiatjarern Ruangparn
Association football midfielders
Kiatjarern Ruangparn
Kiatjarern Ruangparn
Kiatjarern Ruangparn